The 2016–17 Wyoming Cowgirls basketball team represented the University of Wyoming in the 2016–17 college basketball season. The Cowgirls are led by fourteenth year head coach Joe Legerski. The Cowgirls played their home games at the Arena-Auditorium and were members of the Mountain West Conference. They finished the season 22–10, 13–5 in Mountain West play to finish in second place. They lost in the quarterfinals of the Mountain West women's tournament to Fresno State. They were invited to the Women's National Invitation Tournament where they defeated Seattle in the first round before losing in to Washington State in the second round.

Roster

Statistics

Schedule

|-
!colspan=9 style="background:#492f24; color:#ffc425;"| Exhibition

|-
!colspan=9 style="background:#492f24; color:#ffc425;"| Non-conference regular season

|-

|-

|-

|-

|-

|-

|-

|-

|-

|-

|-
!colspan=9 style="background:#492f24; color:#ffc425;"| Mountain West regular season

|-

|-

|-

|-

|-

|-

|-

|-

|-

|-

|-

|-

|-

|-

|-

|-

|-

|-
!colspan=9 style="background:#492f24; color:#ffc425;"| Mountain West Women's Tournament

|-
!colspan=9 style="background:#492f24; color:#ffc425;"| WNIT

Rankings
2016–17 NCAA Division I women's basketball rankings

See also
 2016–17 Wyoming Cowboys basketball team

References

Wyoming Cowgirls basketball seasons
2017 Women's National Invitation Tournament participants
Wyoming Cowgirls
Wyoming Cowgirls